Rosario is the former estate of Seattle mayor and shipbuilder Robert Moran. Due to poor health, Moran moved to Orcas Island and between 1906 and 1909 built his estate. Wood and stone material found on the island were used to construct the estate's houses and buildings. In 1921, Moran gave a large portion of his property to the state of Washington for the creation of Moran State Park. The mansion and its grounds remain in private hands, operated as Rosario Resort and Spa. The Rosario mansion features a museum honoring Robert Moran, complete with original furnishings. The mansion's music room is home to a 1913 34-rank Aeolian pipe organ and 1900 Steinway grand piano, both of which are played for visitors. Rosario was listed on the National Register of Historic Places in 1978.

References

 

Houses in San Juan County, Washington
Houses on the National Register of Historic Places in Washington (state)
National Register of Historic Places in San Juan County, Washington